Charleston Hughes (born December 14, 1983) is a professional Canadian football defensive end for the Saskatchewan Roughriders of the Canadian Football League (CFL). He was signed by the Calgary Stampeders as a street free agent in 2008 and won two Grey Cup championships over his ten-year tenure with the club (in 2008 and 2014). He is a six-time CFL All-Star and eight-time division All-Star. He was also named the West Division's Most Outstanding Defensive Player in 2013. He played college football for Northwood. Hughes has also been a member of the Philadelphia Eagles (NFL), Toronto Argonauts, and the Hamilton Tiger-Cats.

Professional career

Calgary Stampeders
Hughes joined the Stamps for the 2008 CFL season. He played in 15 of the 18 regular season games and recorded a career high 66 tackles. The Stampeders won the 96th Grey Cup against the Montreal Alouettes on November 23, 2008.

Philadelphia Eagles
Following a successful rookie year in the CFL, Hughes joined the Philadelphia Eagles of the National Football League. He was released before playing any regular season games.

Calgary Stampeders (II)
He returned to the CFL midway through the 2009 CFL season. Charleston Hughes finished the 2012 season ranked second in sacks with 11, trailing only Keron Williams who had 12. Hughes led the CFL in sacks for the 2013 season with 18, one shy of the franchise record of 19 set by Harold Hallman in 1986. In 2016,for the second time in his career, Hughes finished the season with the most sacks, this time with 16. For his efforts, he was named a CFL All-Star for the third time in his career and was his team's nominee for Most Outstanding Defensive Player award for a third time. Following the 2016 season Hughes and the Stamps agreed to a contract extension, keeping him with the club through the 2018 season. Hughes had another productive season in 2017 accumulating 11 quarterback sacks, earning his fourth CFL All-Star award in the process. At of the end of the 2017 season Hughes' 99 sacks tied him with Will Johnson for the most sacks in Stampeders franchise history.

Saskatchewan Roughriders
On February 2, 2018, Hughes was traded to the Hamilton Tiger-Cats in exchange for draft pick positioning. However, he was traded later that day to the Saskatchewan Roughriders for quarterback Vernon Adams Jr. Hughes was charged with impaired driving on October 11, 2018, with a court date set for October 31, 2018. Following the incident the Riders suspended Hughes for the team's critical Week 19 match against the Calgary Stampeders and fined him with the maximum disciplinary fine allowed under the CBA. He finished the season having played in 17 games and contributing 35 tackles and 15 sacks. Hughes had an outstanding season with the Riders in 2019, and was named a CFL Top Performer for the months of July and September. He did not play in 2020 due to the cancellation of the 2020 CFL season and, as a pending 2021 free agent, he was released by the Roughriders on February 3, 2021.

Toronto Argonauts
On February 4, 2021, Hughes signed with the Toronto Argonauts to a two-year contract. He played in nine games where he had 18 defensive tackles and two sacks and was released on December 27, 2021.

Saskatchewan Roughriders (II)
On May 10, 2022, it was announced that Hughes had re-signed with the Saskatchewan Roughriders.

Statistics

References

External links
Saskatchewan Roughriders bio
Calgary Stampeders bio 
Philadelphia Eagles bio
Official website of Charleston Hughes

1983 births
Living people
American football linebackers
American players of Canadian football
Calgary Stampeders players
Saskatchewan Roughriders players
Toronto Argonauts players
Canadian football defensive linemen
Northwood Timberwolves football players
Players of American football from Michigan
Sportspeople from Saginaw, Michigan